Artur Jorge dos Santos Soares (born 15 February 1996), better known simply as Tucka, is a professional Portuguese football forward currently playing for Juventude Desportiva Carregosense.

Club career
He made his senior league debut for Arouca on 23 May 2015 in a Primeira Liga 1-2 home loss against Moreirense. He spent time on loan with a LigaPro side AD Oliveirense, making 30 league appearances and scoring 3 goals.

References

External links 

Tucka at ZeroZero

1996 births
Living people
Portuguese footballers
Association football forwards
F.C. Arouca players
AD Oliveirense players
Primeira Liga players
G.D. Gafanha players
Sportspeople from Aveiro District